Klaus Zander (born 6 September 1956) is a former West German basketball player. He competed in the men's tournament at the 1984 Summer Olympics.

References

External links
 

1956 births
Living people
German men's basketball players
Olympic basketball players of West Germany
Basketball players at the 1984 Summer Olympics
BSC Saturn Köln players
Sportspeople from Cologne